Janice Maree Edwards (born 2 February 1962) is an Australian politician. She has been the member for Bendigo West in the Victorian Legislative Assembly since 2010.

Edwards has a BA (Hons) from La Trobe University, Bendigo.

Edwards was first elected at the 2010 Victorian state election and has been re-elected ever since. Prior to her election she worked for the previous Member, Bob Cameron.

On 7 March 2017, Edwards was elected Deputy Speaker of the Legislative Assembly and became the Speaker in August 2022, the fourth woman to hold the position. Ater the November 2022 state election, Edwards was re-elected as Speaker in December 2022 unopposed.

Edwards has four children.

References

External links
 Parliamentary voting record of Maree Edwards at Victorian Parliament Tracker

1962 births
Living people
Australian Labor Party members of the Parliament of Victoria
Members of the Victorian Legislative Assembly
La Trobe University alumni
21st-century Australian politicians
21st-century Australian women politicians
Women members of the Victorian Legislative Assembly
Speakers of the Victorian Legislative Assembly